Euchlaena marginaria, the ochre euchlaena moth, is a moth of the family Geometridae. The species was first described by Charles Sedgwick Minot in 1869. It is found in North America, where it has been recorded from south-central British Columbia and Idaho to Nova Scotia and south to Florida and Missouri. The habitat consists of mixed wood and deciduous forests.

The wingspan is about 40 mm. The wings are light to dark brown with dark speckling. Adults are on wing from May to August in one generation in the north and two in the southern part of the range.

The larvae feed on Alnus, Salix, Spiraea, Amelanchier, Viburnum and Betula papyrifera. They are twig mimics. They are mottled dark brown.

References

Moths described in 1869
Angeronini